BKK is the IATA airport code for Suvarnabhumi Airport, Thailand.

It can also refer to:
 The previous airport code of Don Mueang International Airport, Thailand (now DMK)
 The British Karate Kyokushinkai
 Bergenshalvøens Kommunale Kraftselskap, a Norwegian power company
 The city of Bangkok, Thailand
 The Backus-Kehoe-Kydland puzzle, a puzzle in economics
 Betriebskrankenkasse, a type of insurance for healthcare in Germany
 Budapesti Közlekedési Központ (Budapest Transport Centre), the unified transport operator of Budapest, Hungary
 The Bernstein–Khovanskii–Kushnirenko theorem, in algebraic geometry
 Bukkake